Events from the year 1961 in North Korea.

Incumbents
Premier: Kim Il-sung 
Supreme Leader: Kim Il-sung

Events
4th Congress of the Workers' Party of Korea

 July 6 - DPRK - USSR Treaty of Friendship, Co-operation and Mutual Assistance
 July 11 - Sino-North Korean Mutual Aid and Cooperation Friendship Treaty

See also
Years in Japan
Years in South Korea

References

 
North Korea
1960s in North Korea
Years of the 20th century in North Korea
North Korea